Brett William Laxton (born October 5, 1973) is an American former professional baseball pitcher who played in parts of two seasons for the Oakland Athletics and the Kansas City Royals of Major League Baseball (MLB). He is the son of former major leaguer Bill Laxton.

Playing career
Laxton attended Audubon High School in Audubon, New Jersey, graduating in 1992. He was part of the World Series-winning American Legion team from the year before. Laxton was drafted by the San Diego Padres in the fourth round, but decided to attend Louisiana State University for four years. He was part of the 1993 and 1996 championship LSU Tigers baseball teams, and as a freshman set a championship-game record for strikeouts in 1993 with 16. In 1994, he played collegiate summer baseball with the Cotuit Kettleers of the Cape Cod Baseball League, and returned to the league in 1996 to play for the Hyannis Mets.

Laxton was drafted by the Oakland Athletics in the 24th round in 1996. He was called up to the majors for the first time on June 18, 1999. Laxton appeared in three games for the A's as a reliever during the 1999 season and six games for the Kansas City Royals during the 2000 season.

Post-playing career
Laxton currently works for baseball bat manufacturer Marucci Sports in Baton Rouge as a bat craftsman.

See also
List of second-generation Major League Baseball players

References

External links

Brett Laxton at Pura Pelota (Venezuelan Professional Baseball League)
 

1973 births
Living people
American expatriate baseball players in Canada
Audubon High School (New Jersey) alumni
Baseball players from New Jersey
Camden Riversharks players
Cotuit Kettleers players
Edmonton Trappers players
Huntsville Stars players
Hyannis Harbor Hawks players
Kansas City Royals players
Louisiana State University alumni
LSU Tigers baseball players
Major League Baseball pitchers
Navegantes del Magallanes players
American expatriate baseball players in Venezuela
Oakland Athletics players
Omaha Golden Spikes players
Omaha Royals players
People from Audubon, New Jersey
People from Stratford, New Jersey
Southern Oregon Timberjacks players
Sportspeople from Camden County, New Jersey
Tiburones de La Guaira players
Vancouver Canadians players
Visalia Oaks players